Widgelli is a small village located in the local government area of the City of Griffith in the Australian state of New South Wales.

Widgelli Post Office opened on 26 October 1953 and closed in 1977.

References

Towns in New South Wales